Sir Henry Smith (April 23, 1812 – September 18, 1868) was a Canadian lawyer and political figure. He represented Frontenac County in the Parliament of the Province of Canada, and later in the 1st Parliament of Ontario.

He was born in London, England in 1812 and came to Montreal with his family some time before 1818. The family later moved to Kingston in Upper Canada. Smith's father, also named Henry Smith, served as the first warden of the provincial penitentiary at Kingston from 1835 to 1849. The son studied law with Christopher Alexander Hagerman and was called to the bar in 1834. He was elected to the Legislative Assembly of the Province of Canada in 1841 for Frontenac, serving until 1861. He was a friend of Sir John A. Macdonald and also supported him politically for much of that time.

In 1846, Smith was named Queen's Counsel. In 1854, he was named Solicitor General for Canada West in the Macnab-Morin government. He served as speaker of the house from 1858 to 1861. Smith also served as lawyer for the Grand Trunk Railway in Kingston. Smith fell out with Macdonald over his attempts to gain a knighthood. However, in 1860, he was knighted by the Prince of Wales at Quebec City during the Prince's visit to Canada. Switching to the Reformers, he was defeated in subsequent elections in 1861 and 1863.

In 1867, he was elected to the Legislature of the new province of Ontario, again as a Conservative, but died in Kingston in 1868.

Electoral record

External links
Biography at the Dictionary of Canadian Biography Online
Legislative Assembly of Ontario:  Henry Smith.

1812 births
1868 deaths
English emigrants to pre-Confederation Quebec
Members of the Legislative Assembly of Upper Canada
People from Kingston, Ontario
Politicians from London
Progressive Conservative Party of Ontario MPPs
Canadian King's Counsel
English emigrants to pre-Confederation Ontario
Immigrants to Lower Canada
Immigrants to Upper Canada
Members of the Legislative Assembly of the Province of Canada from Canada West